The Tulpehocken Station Historic District is a historic area in the Germantown neighborhood of Philadelphia, Pennsylvania. Large suburban houses were built in the area from about 1850 to 1900 in a variety of styles including Carpenter Gothic, Italianate, and Bracketed as part of the Picturesque Movement of architecture.  In the 1870s styles moved toward High Victorian and  Second Empire.  The district was added to the National Register of Historic Places in 1985, and it covers about six square blocks, bounded by McCallum Street on the north, the Pennsylvania Railroad tracks on the south, Tulpehocken Street on the west, and Walnut Lane on the east. Thirty-seven buildings in the district are considered to be significant and 118 are considered to be contributing, with only 13 considered to be intrusions.

Contributing properties
Among the  district's 155 contributing properties are:
Comawaben, aka Charles Currie House, 50 West Walnut Lane, built 1899 (Mantle Fielding, architect)
Conyers Button House, 143 W. Walnut Lane, c. 1875
Kimball House, 144 West Walnut Lane, built 1860
Lister Townsend House, 6015 Wayne Ave., built 1887
Ebenezer Maxwell House, 200 W. Tulpehocken St., built 1859
Mitchell House, 200 W. Walnut Lane, built c. 1856
Morris House, 131 W. Walnut Lane, c. 1853
George T. Pearson Residence, 125 West Walnut Lane, 1852–54, altered 1893
St. Peter's Episcopal Church of Germantown, 6000 Wayne Ave., built 1873
Tulpehocken Station, 314 West Tulpehocken St., built 1878
Van Dyke Residence, 150 West Walnut Lane, built c. 1860

See also

Awbury Historic District
Colonial Germantown Historic District
Rittenhousetown Historic District
Chestnut Hill Historic District

References

External links

Description at LivingPlaces.com

Historic districts in Philadelphia
Houses on the National Register of Historic Places in Pennsylvania
National Register of Historic Places in Philadelphia
Germantown, Philadelphia
Railway stations on the National Register of Historic Places in Pennsylvania
Houses in Philadelphia
Historic districts on the National Register of Historic Places in Pennsylvania